Snuffy Smile was a long running Japanese record label based in Tokyo and operated by Yoichi Eimori between 1992 and 2005. The label concentrated mainly on the 7-inch vinyl format gaining a large following worldwide. The label released records from a constantly growing roster of some of Japan's finest melodic punk bands as well as other punk bands from around the globe.

The Snuffy Smile label officially ceased to operate in 2005 but then Yoichi moved from Tokyo to Kyoto, the label gained a new lease of life, added an 's' to the name to become Snuffy Smiles with new releases continuing for the foreseeable future.

Partial list of notable artists and albums
CD Albums
Wall - A Silent Voice Wanders The Sea Of Contradiction
Lovemen - Children Eat A Nightmare
Blew - You're Not The Only One
The Urchin - Another Day, Another Sorry State
Split 7"
Screaming Fat Rat / Hot Water Music - F State Revisited
My Winter Jane / Discount - s/t
Braid / Three Minute Movie - A Split 7 Inch
The Miles Apart / This World Is Mine - A Split 7 Inch

See also
 List of record labels

External links
Snuffy Smile @ Discogs

Post-hardcore record labels
Punk record labels